Dresslerella is a genus of miniature orchids, with about 13 species native to South and Central America. The genus is named after orchidologist Robert L. Dressler. Some species are noted to be pubescent.

List of species 
Dresslerella archilae Luer & Béhar, Monogr. Syst. Bot. Missouri Bot. Gard. 57: 140 (1995).
Dresslerella caesariata Luer, Selbyana 2: 185 (1978).
Dresslerella cloesii Luer, Monogr. Syst. Bot. Missouri Bot. Gard. 103: 277 (2005).
Dresslerella elvallensis Luer, Selbyana 3: 2 (1976).
Dresslerella hirsutissima (C.Schweinf.) Luer, Selbyana 2: 185 (1978).
Dresslerella hispida (L.O.Williams) Luer, Selbyana 3: 4 (1976).
Dresslerella lasiocampa Luer & Hirtz, Monogr. Syst. Bot. Missouri Bot. Gard. 103: 278 (2005).
Dresslerella pertusa (Dressler) Luer, Selbyana 3: 6 (1976).
Dresslerella pilosissima (Schltr.) Luer, Selbyana 2: 185 (1978).
Dresslerella portillae Luer & Hirtz, Monogr. Syst. Bot. Missouri Bot. Gard. 88: 102 (2002).
Dresslerella powellii (Ames) Luer, Selbyana 3: 8 (1976).
Dresslerella sijmiana Luer, Monogr. Syst. Bot. Missouri Bot. Gard. 88: 103 (2002).
Dresslerella stellaris Luer & R.Escobar, Selbyana 2: 188 (1978).

References 

  (1976) Selbyana 3(1): 1.
  (2006) Epidendroideae (Part One). Genera Orchidacearum 4: 352 ff. Oxford University Press.

External links 

 
Pleurothallidinae genera